Eric Cornel (born April 11, 1996) is a Canadian professional ice hockey centre who currently plays for the Iserlohn Roosters of the Deutsche Eishockey Liga (DEL).

Playing career
Following the conclusion of his entry-level deal with the Sabres, on June 25, 2019, Cornel was not tendered a qualifying offer by Buffalo, releasing him to free agency.

Following the completion of his fifth season with the Rochester Americans in the American Hockey League, having made 277 appearances for 78 points, Cornel left the club as a free agent. With the following North American season delayed due to the COVID-19 pandemic, Cornel opted to sign his first contract abroad in agreeing to a one-year contract with German outfit, the Nürnberg Ice Tigers of the DEL for the 2020–21 season, on November 27, 2020.

On July 14, 2021, Cornel left the Ice Tigers but continued in the DEL by signing a two-year contract with the Iserlohn Roosters.

Career statistics

Regular season and playoffs

International

References

External links

1996 births
Living people
Canadian ice hockey centres
Buffalo Sabres draft picks
Iserlohn Roosters players
Nürnberg Ice Tigers players
Peterborough Petes (ice hockey) players
Rochester Americans players
People from Leeds and Grenville United Counties
Ice hockey people from Ontario
Ice hockey players at the 2012 Winter Youth Olympics